Donald Ndleleni Nxumalo (born July 2, 1988) is a South African interior designer and television personality.

He holds a degree in design from the Tshwane University of Technology and runs a Gauteng-based interior design studio called DNX Design Studio. He was a regularly featured guest on the South African Magazine Program Top Billing, where he was also the inaugural design winner of Win A Home in 2014.
 
He has released numerous interior design lines and is recognized as one of the most prolific and leading interior designers in South Africa

References

South African interior designers
1988 births
Living people